|}

The Yeats Stakes is a Listed flat horse race in Ireland open to thoroughbreds aged three years only. It is run at Navan over a distance of 1 mile and 5 furlongs (2,616 metres), and it is scheduled to take place each year in May.

The race was run for the first time in 2017.

Winners

See also
 Horse racing in Ireland
 List of Irish flat horse races

References

Racing Post:

Flat races in Ireland
Navan Racecourse
Open long distance horse races
Recurring sporting events established in 2017
2017 establishments in Ireland